Lichun is a town under the administration of Pengzhou, Sichuan, China. , it has eight residential communities and 22 villages under its administration.

References 

Township-level divisions of Sichuan
Pengzhou